Adnan Maulana (born 23 October 1999) is an Indonesian badminton player affiliated with Jaya Raya Jakarta club. He won a bronze medal in the mixed doubles at the 2021 Southeast Asian Games partnered with Mychelle Crhystine Bandaso.

Career 
In 2019, Maulana won his first senior international title at the 2019 Iran Fajr International in the men's doubles event partnering Ghifari Anandaffa Prihardika. He then won his World Tour title at the Russian Open in the mixed doubles with Mychelle Crhystine Bandaso. He and Bandaso beating host pair Evgenij Dremin and Evgenia Dimova in the final in straight games. Maulana and Bandaso also finished as runners-up at the World Tour Super 100 in Hyderabad and Indonesia.

In 2023, Maulana started the season with new partner Nita Violina Marwah and reached the finals of Thailand International Challenge.

Achievements

Southeast Asian Games 
Mixed doubles

BWF World Tour (1 title, 2 runners-up) 
The BWF World Tour, which was announced on 19 March 2017 and implemented in 2018, is a series of elite badminton tournaments sanctioned by the Badminton World Federation (BWF). The BWF World Tour is divided into levels of World Tour Finals, Super 1000, Super 750, Super 500, Super 300 (part of the HSBC World Tour), and the BWF Tour Super 100.

Mixed doubles

BWF International Challenge/Series (1 title, 4 runners-up) 
Men's doubles

Mixed doubles

  BWF International Challenge tournament
  BWF International Series tournament

Performance timeline

National team 
 Junior level

 Senior level

Individual competitions

Junior level  
 Boys' doubles

Senior level

Men's doubles

Mixed doubles

References

External links 
 

Living people
1999 births
People from Jambi (city)
Sportspeople from Jambi
Indonesian male badminton players
Competitors at the 2021 Southeast Asian Games
Southeast Asian Games bronze medalists for Indonesia
Southeast Asian Games medalists in badminton
21st-century Indonesian people